The Battery Council International (BCI) is a trade association of manufacturers, recyclers, distributors, and retailers of original-equipment and after-market automobile batteries and other lead batteries. Founded in 1924, BCI has its headquarters in Chicago, USA, and an office in Washington, D.C., USA.

It promotes the recycling of lead-acid batteries, and claims that 99% of all lead batteries are eventually recycled.

After Ecology Center,  Environmental Defence and the Clean Car Campaign published a report in 2003 which called for the elimination of lead-based car batteries,    BCI issued a press release disputing the report's conclusions.

The trade association provides industry standards for testing, dimensions, and sizes of lead-acid batteries worth over $1 billion in the North American market each year. The trade association provides models for legislation to encourage the recycling and safe handling of automotive lead-acid battery products. 

It also organizes regular conferences and meetings.

In August 2017, Battery Council International launched Essential Energy Everyday, a joint initiative with the International Lead Association to increase awareness about the importance of lead batteries as a key resource for sustainable, essential, reliable, and safe energy sources and storage.

References

External links
Official Website
Essential Energy Everyday

Trade associations based in the United States